Sydney Chamber Choir is a choir from Sydney formed as the Sydney University Chamber Choir in 1975.

Following its formation in 1975, the Sydney Chamber Choir quickly established itself as a champion of Renaissance Music, especially the works of Josquin des Prez. Under the leadership of founding director Nicholas Routley, the choir was also a pioneer in revitalising Sydney performances of Bach and Handel. At the same time, the Sydney Chamber Choir began a program of commissioning new music from Australian composers, a tradition which continues today with world premieres of works by Nigel Butterley, Clare Maclean and Paul Stanhope occurring in recent seasons.

The Sydney Chamber Choir has toured widely in eastern Australia and performed in the UK. The choir’s performances are regularly broadcast across the country on ABC Classic FM, and CD recordings are available on the ABC Classics and Tall Poppies labels. The choir has also recorded soundtracks for a number of feature films.

In 2006, in addition to its Sydney concert series, the Choir appeared in the inaugural Aurora Festival of contemporary music, based in western Sydney; a studio recording of the Aurora concert program has been released on CD by Publications by Wirripang. In February of that year, the choir joined with The Tallis Scholars to perform Tallis' 40-voice motet Spem in alium in City Recital Hall Angel Place. As part of the same concert, the Sydney Chamber Choir presented works by Australian composers Ross Edwards and Paul Stanhope.

In 2007 the Sydney Chamber Choir commissioned a new work from Australian composer Nigel Butterley. The work, Beni Avshalom was completed almost fifty years after Butterley's frequently performed landmark choral work The True Samaritan.

In 2009 the Sydney Chamber Choir was ranked third out of a field of ten top choirs from around the world in its first appearance in an international choral competition. The Choir took out 3rd prize in two mixed-voice categories (polyphony and folklore), in the prestigious 41st Tolosa International Choral Festival in Spain.

The current music director, Sam Allchurch commenced in 2019.

Awards and nominations

AIR Awards
The Australian Independent Record Awards (commonly known informally as AIR Awards) is an annual awards night to recognise, promote and celebrate the success of Australia's Independent Music sector.

|-
| AIR Awards of 2018
|Paul Stanhope: Lux Aeterna 
| Best Independent Classical Album
| 
|-

ARIA Award for Best Classical Album

|-
| 1987 || The Victoria Requiem – Sydney University Chamber Choir || ARIA Award for Best Classical Album ||

APRA Classical Music Awards
The APRA Classical Music Awards are presented annually by Australasian Performing Right Association (APRA) and Australian Music Centre (AMC).

|-
| 2006 || Southern Star (excerpts) (Christopher Willcock, Michael Leunig) – Sydney Chamber Choir, Marshall McGuire || Vocal or Choral Work of the Year ||

Musical director
Nicholas Routley (1975 - 1982)
Neil McEwan (1982 - 1985)
Nicholas Routley (1985 - 1990)
Hans-Dieter Michatz (1990 - 1993)
Nicholas Routley (1993 - 2006)
Paul Stanhope (2006 - 2015)
Richard Gill (2015 - 2018)
Sam Allchurch (2019 - )

References

External links 
 homepage
 Sydney Chamber Choir at Australian Music Centre

APRA Award winners
Australian choirs
Musical groups established in 1975